Pisidium lilljeborgii is a species of freshwater bivalve from the family Sphaeriidae.

Description
A moderately swollen (tumid), trapezoidal shell. The umbos are just behind the mid point and described as fairly narrow. The surface (periostracum) is slightly glossy and has coarse, irregular concentric striae. The colour is grey to brownish white. Pisidium lilljeborgii has a less equilateral shape than Pisidium hibernicum 3-4.5mm.

Distribution and conservation status
 Not listed in IUCN red list – not evaluated (NE)
 Germany – high endangered (Stark gefährdet) 
 Nordic countries: Denmark, Faroes, Finland, Iceland, Norway and Sweden
Great Britain and Ireland

References

External links
Pisidium lilljeborgii at Animalbase taxonomy,short description, biology,status (threats), images

lilljeborgii
Molluscs described in 1886